Hit By A Train: The Best of Old 97's is a best-of compilation album by American country/rock band Old 97's, first released on June 20, 2006.

Track listing
"Stoned"
"Cryin' Drunk"
"Doreen" (rock version)
"Victoria"
"Timebomb"
"Niteclub"
"Four Leaf Clover"
"El Paso"
"Jagged"
"Lonely Holiday"
"Murder (Or A Heart Attack)"
"Valentine"
"The Villain"
"King Of All Of The World"
"Question"
"Rollerskate Skinny"
"Barrier Reef" (Live)
"Nineteen" (Live)

Personnel
Old 97's
Rhett Miller - vocals, guitar
Murry Hammond - bass, vocals
Ken Bethea - guitar
Phillip Peeples - drums, percussion

Additional Musicians
Chuck Langford - guitar on Doreen outro
Jon Rauhouse - pedal steel, banjo
Wally Gagel - piano, Mellotron, percussion
Jon Brion - Vox organ on "Murder (Or A Heart Attack)"
Andrew Williams - odds and ends

References

Old 97's albums
2006 greatest hits albums
Rhino Entertainment compilation albums